Bahupur is a village of Patti tahasil. Pratapgarh is a district of Bahupur. Pratapgarh district, Uttar Pradesh is in India.

Villages in Pratapgarh district, Uttar Pradesh